Tonga's economy is characterized by a large nonmonetary sector and a heavy dependence on remittances from the half of the country's population that lives abroad, chiefly in Australia, New Zealand, and the United States. Much of the monetary sector of the economy is dominated, if not owned, by the royal family and nobles. This is particularly true of the telecommunications and satellite services. Much of small business, particularly retailing on Tongatapu, is now dominated by recent Chinese immigrants who arrived under a cash-for-passports scheme that ended in 1998.

The manufacturing sector consists of handicrafts and a few other very smallscale industries, all of which contribute only about 3% of GDP. Commercial business activities also are inconspicuous and, to a large extent, are dominated by the same large trading companies found throughout the South Pacific. In September 1974, the country's first commercial trading bank, the Bank of Tonga, opened.

Rural Tongans rely on plantation and subsistence agriculture. Coconuts, vanilla beans, and bananas are the major cash crops. The processing of coconuts into copra and desiccated coconut is the only significant industry. Pigs and poultry are the major types of livestock. Horses are kept for draft purposes, primarily by farmers working their api. More cattle are being raised, and beef imports are declining.

Tonga's development plans emphasize a growing private sector, upgrading agricultural productivity, revitalizing the squash and vanilla bean industries, developing tourism, and improving the island's communications and transportation systems. A small but growing construction sector is developing in response to the inflow of aid monies and remittances from Tongans abroad. The copra industry is plagued by world prices that have been depressed for years.

Efforts are being made to discover ways to diversify. One hope is seen in fisheries; tests have shown that sufficient skipjack tuna pass through Tongan waters to support a fishing industry. Another potential development activity is exploitation of forests, which cover 35% of the kingdom's land area but are decreasing as land is cleared. Coconut trees past their prime bearing years also provide a potential source of lumber.

The tourist industry is relatively undeveloped; however, the government recognizes that tourism can play a major role in economic development, and efforts are being made to increase this source of revenue. Cruise ships often stop in Nukualofa and Vava'u.

According to the CIA World Factbook,

Energy

Electricity - production:
53 GW·h (2008)

Electricity - production by source:
foclear:
fossil fuel: 92%
nuclear: 0%
hydro: 0%
renewables: 8% (2009)

Electricity - consumption:
38,13 GW·h (2003)

Electricity - exports:
0 kW·h (2003)

Electricity - imports:
0 kW·h (2003)

In 2021 the Tongan government committed to a target of 70% renewable energy by 2030.

In July 2012 Tonga Power opened Tonga's first solar photovoltaic generator, the 1.32 MW Maama Mai solar farm on Tongatapu. This was followed by a 6MW solar farm spread across three sites on Tongatapu. A pair of 13 MW / 24 MWh grid batteries began operating on the main island in 2022. An Outer Islands Renewable Energy Project is installing solar / battery systems on nine smaller islands, and upgrading the electrical grids on 'Eua and Vava'u.

Other data
Agriculture - products:
squash, coconuts, copra, bananas, vanilla beans, cocoa, coffee, ginger, black pepper; fish

Tonga produced in 2018:

 148 thousand tons of coconut;
 20 thousand tons of squash;
 6.7 thousand tons of cassava;
 6.4 thousand tons of sweet potato;
 6 thousand tons of vegetable;
 4.5 thousand tons of yam;

In addition to smaller productions of other agricultural products. 

Currency:
1 pa'anga (T$) = 100 seniti

Exchange rates:
pa'anga (T$) per US$1 – 1.9716 (2004), 2.142 (2003), 2.1952 (2002), 2.1236 (2001), 1.6250 (November 1999), 1.4921 (1998), 1.2635 (1997), 1.2323 (1996), 1.2709 (1995)

References